Owen Hills (born 25 August 1996) is an English professional rugby union player, his principal position is prop.  He plays for Nottingham in the RFU Championship.

Career
Hills was a Leicester Tigers supporter and season ticket holder before joining the club's academy at the age of 15.  In 2015 Hills was named in England Under 20s squad for the 2015 World Rugby Under 20 Championship.

Hills was mentioned by Leicester Tigers head coach Richard Cockerill as young player ready to step up and cover for first team players missing for the 2015 Rugby World Cup.  However, Hills was injured in a testimonial for long-serving Leicester player Marcos Ayerza and missed the whole of the 2015–16 season.

He returned from injury in 2016 playing for Moseley and Nottingham on dual-registration.  During the 2017–18 season he played for Loughborough Students and made his first team debut for Leicester in an Anglo Welsh Cup match against Bath at the Recreation Ground.

He returned to Nottingham ahead of the 2020–21 season.

References

1996 births
Living people
English rugby union players
Leicester Tigers players
Rugby union players from Redditch
Rugby union props